The Platinum Highway is part of the N4, and a major South African highway built under concessions with a private contractor. In 2001, the project was voted Infrastructure Deal of the Year by Project Finance International Magazine. It took eight years to complete. The highway is part of the Trans-Kalahari Corridor, which links four African countries (Mozambique, South Africa, Botswana and Namibia) and two oceans (the Indian and Atlantic). The contract had tougher concession terms than were seen in previous contracts.

The Platinum Highway is the section of the N4 from the Skilpadshek Border with Botswana, through Zeerust, Swartruggens, Rustenburg and Brits, to the interchange with the N1 in Pretoria (Tshwane). The concessionaire responsible for this road is Bakwena and the entire route is a toll road. There are 4 tollgates on the route (one west of Swartruggens; one east of Rustenburg; one east of Brits; one at the N1 interchange).

See also
N4 (South Africa)

References

Roads in South Africa
Year of establishment missing

Toll roads in South Africa